Jianshi railway station is a railway station located in Hubei Province, People's Republic of China, on the Yiwan Railway which operated by China Railway Corporation.

Structure

Service

History
It's still under construction.

Railway stations in Hubei